is a Japanese TV director/producer whose credits include Tsuburaya Productions' popular Ultra Series.

Personal history
Born in 1967, Yagi grew up during the boom of tokusatsu television shows in Japan. In the mid-1990s, he joined Tsuburaya Productions, the creators of the popular Ultra Series, working as an Assistant Director on TV series such as Ultraman Tiga. He made his directorial debut on the fourth episode of the TV mini-series Moon Spiral in 1996. He continued to serve as both a Director and Director of Special Effects for the majority of Tsuburaya Productions' Ultra Series until 2007.

In 2004, Yagi was credited as the Main Director for Ultra Q: Dark Fantasy. The following year, he was promoted to Series Producer for 2005's Ultraman Max, where he made the popular decision to bring in acclaimed directors Shusuke Kaneko and Takashi Miike to direct episodes for the series. In 2007, he acted as the Series Organizer and Main Director for the late-night Ultraseven X. Around the same time, he also began work on his first feature film, Superior Ultraman 8 Brothers.

Yagi retired from Tsuburaya Productions in January 2008 to pursue a career as a freelance director/producer. His first directorial piece after leaving Tsuburaya Productions was Toei's Urban Legend Sepia.

Filmography

External links
Takeshi Yagi's Blog / Electric Garden

Japanese film directors
Living people
Year of birth missing (living people)